George Edgar may refer to:
 George Edgar (academic)  (1837–1913), president of Florida State University
 George Edgar (writer) (1877–1918), English writer and journalist